Mykola Markevych (7 February 1804 – 21 June 1860) was a Ukrainian historian, ethnographer, musician and poet of Ukrainian Cossack descent, who was known as a friend of Alexander Pushkin, Wilhelm Küchelbecker, Anton Delvig and Kondraty Ryleyev. His main work is the History of Little Russia (in 5 vols.), which was published in Moscow between 1842 and 1843.

History 
Mykola Markevych was born in Dunaiets, Chernigov Governorate, Russian Empire (now located in modern-day Ukraine) on 7 February 1804. He studied at the Saint Petersburg Pedagogical Institute from 1817 to 1820. Then he studied piano and composition in Moscow. He served as an officer in the Russian Imperial army from 1820–1824.

Markevych collected many historical materials on Cossack history and Ukrainian folk songs at his estate and around the area of Central Ukraine. He wrote many works on Ukrainian folk customs and beliefs, as well as foods. He also wrote extensively on Zaporozhian Cossacks, most notably on Yakov Barabash and Martyn Pushkar. His works influenced his friends Alexander Pushkin and Wilhelm Küchelbecker as well as Nikolai Gogol.

He died in Turivka, Poltava Governorate, Russian Empire on 21 June 1860. Many of his works have not been published. His personal archive and diary are kept at the Institute of Russian Literature in Saint Petersburg.

References

External links 
 Косачевская  Н. А. Маркевич, 1804—1860. — Л. : Изд-во ЛГУ, 1987. — 284 с.

Ukrainian composers
Ukrainian poets
19th-century historians from the Russian Empire
19th-century Ukrainian historians
1804 births
1860 deaths
Ukrainian ethnographers
19th-century composers
19th-century poets